The Race to the Sky may refer to:

 Montana Race to the Sky, a dogsled race held in Montana, USA
 Highlands Race to the Sky, a motor sport hillclimb race in Queenstown, New Zealand